Mecyna cocosica is a moth in the family Crambidae. It was described by Eugene G. Munroe in 1959. It is found in Costa Rica, where it was described from Cocos Island.

References

Moths described in 1959
Spilomelinae